Sarunyoo Wongkrachang  or spelt Sarunyu Wongkrachang  (Thai: ศรัณยู วงษ์กระจ่าง; nickname: Tua–ตั้ว; October 17, 1960 in Bang Khonthi District, Samut Songkhram Province, Thailand – June 10, 2020), was a Thai actor, singer, host, activist, screenwriter, director and producer. He was a producer of Thai TV dramas and reached his peak as Thailand's top actor during 80s–90s, best known for his various hugely successful TV drama roles, including Gao Ee Kao Nai Hong Dang (1984), Massaya (1985), Baan Sai Thong (1987), Jaosao Kong Arnon (1988), Rattikarn Yod Rak (1989), Wanalee (1990), Roymarn (1990), Wanida (1991), Tawipop (1992), Mon Rak Look Thoong (1995), Duay Rang Atittarn (1996) and Nai Hoy Tamil (2001).

Sarunyoo acted in more than 50 TV dramas, 20 films, and 20 stage plays, including legendary Mon Rak Look Thoong which became the 3rd most-watched TV drama of all time in Thailand with viewership rating of 36%.  He won a Mekhala Award for Best Actor for his role in Tawipop.

Under Saman Karn Lakorn company, Sarunyoo directed, screen-wrote and produced a stage play named Langkha Daeng and TV dramas for Channel 7 including Suparb Buroot Look Puchai (2003 and 2013), Hua Jai Tuan (2014), Roy Rak Rang Kaen (2015), and Ballang Hong (2016).

Early life 
Sarunyoo was born in Kradangnga, Bang Khonthi District, Samut Songkhram Province, Thailand. His four siblings include famous singer and actor Thaneth Warakulnukroh but Sarunyoo was adopted by his own aunt whose surname he has been using ever since.

Sarunyoo completed his high school at Suankularb Wittayalai School Batch 92 and graduated with a bachelor's degree in Architecture from Chulalongkorn University.  He didn't pursue his architect career as later telling BK in an interview that "The architecture faculty's acting club introduced me to what ultimately became the biggest part of my college life. After my third year, I knew that I didn't want to be an architect."

During his college years, Sarunyoo took many leading roles in "Lakorn 'Tapat" or Faculty of Architecture Stage plays and some stage plays of Faculty of Arts as well. Not only with his acting talents, his promising good looks also attracted many fangirls and "Lakorn 'Tapat" became the must-sees of the era among high school and college students and urban-resident workers.   As a stage play actor and a rugby player, Sarunyoo consequently became a college star.

Career 

His first public appearance in Thailand's entertainment scene might be as a 'famous' pin-up in an issue of "Dichan" magazine, Sarunyoo posed for many magazines during his early career.   After graduation, Sarunyoo did many TV dramas, films, stage plays and he sang a lot of drama songs.   Besides, he also joined his seniors from the Faculty of Architecture in a cult TV comedy show called "Petchakart Kwarm Kriad" televised on Channel 9.

Sarunyoo's TV drama debut was Kao Ee Kao Nai Hong Dang on Channel 3.  Only that he looked very young in the TV drama of teen problems, Sarunyoo showed his superb acting skills that you wouldn't think he was just a television newbie.

Politics and activism
He was interested in politics since childhood. Since the incident on October 14, 1973, and in the incident of the Black May 1992, he joined the protest.

In 1998, when Thaksin Shinawatra founded the Thai Rak Thai party, he was one of the 100 party committee members. He proposed a policy to Thaksin, but his policy was not accepted.

In 2006 and 2008, he participated in the People's Alliance for Democracy (PAD) or Yellow Shirts, especially in 2008, becoming one of the leaders of the PAD.

Legacy and impact
Because of his participation in the protest his life was affected, by being removed as a television host and from TV drama roles.

Death 
Sarunyoo died on 10 June 2020 due to liver cancer at King Chulalongkorn Memorial Hospital.

Personal life
Sarunyoo married a famous radio DJ, and businesswoman Hattaya Katesang who was raised in London and came back to Thailand after graduation working for her mother's business as well as being a radio DJ. However, Hattaya met Sarunyoo who she co-starred with in the drama Dok Fah Lae Dome Pu Jong Hong (1989).  They had twin daughters, Supara Wongkrachang (Look Noon) and Seetala Wongkrachang (Look Nang).

Seetala Wongkrachang was a member of the South Korean girl group H1-KEY from January to May 2022, when she left the group due to personal reason.

Filmography

Television

Film

Stage

Discography 

Solo Album

 1992 Krang Neung (Once)
 1995 Hua Jai Look Thoong

Compilation Album

 1995 Mon Rak Look Thoong Original Soundtrack Vol.1 & Vol.2
 2001 Nai Hoy Tamil Original Soundtrack Vol.1 & Vol.2

Awards

Mekhala Awards

Golden Television Awards

Notes

References

External links

1960 births
2020 deaths
Sarunyoo Wongkrachang
Sarunyoo Wongkrachang
Sarunyoo Wongkrachang
Thai television personalities
Sarunyoo Wongkrachang
Sarunyoo Wongkrachang
Sarunyoo Wongkrachang
Sarunyoo Wongkrachang
Sarunyoo Wongkrachang
Sarunyoo Wongkrachang
Sarunyoo Wongkrachang
Sarunyoo Wongkrachang